Jiang Ji-li (born February 2, 1954) is a Chinese author. She is most famous for the memoir, Red Scarf Girl, as well as The Magical Monkey King. She grew up and lived in Shanghai, China in a large apartment with her family.

Early life
Ji-li lived in a 350-square-foot apartment with a small bathroom. At this period of time, many other people did not have large apartments such as hers, classifying her as part of the upper class during the Cultural Revolution. During this time period, she lived with her father Jiang Xi-reng, her mother Ying-Chen, her brother Ji-Yong, her sister Ji-Yun and her grandmother for a brief period of time.  Her housekeeper, Song Po-po, also lived with them.  Ji-li was a star student until 1966, when Chairman Mao started the Cultural Revolution. When she was 13, her father, a theater owner was falsely accused of counter-revolutionary crimes and was detained and forced to do hard labor by the Chinese government.  Ji-li was humiliated by her peers at school who blamed her for her family's "black", or "anticommunist" past and prevented her from becoming a Red Successor, a person who would be appointed as a Red Guard when they were old enough.

When the Revolution ended, Ji-li, later followed by most of her family, moved to Hawaii. In 1998, Red Scarf Girl, a memoir of her life during the Cultural Revolution, was published and garnered a number of awards.  Following the success of Red Scarf Girl, Ji-li continued writing books, notably The Magical Monkey King, a retelling of a traditional Chinese tale about the beginning of the trickster Monkey King's journey.

Adulthood
Ji-li graduated from Shanghai Teacher's College and Shanghai University before moving to Hawaii in 1984. She graduated from the University of Hawaii and began working as an operations analyst for a hotel chain.  Ji-li became a budget director for a healthcare company in Chicago. In 1992, she co-founded East-West Exchange, promoting cultural exchange between western countries and China. In 2003, she started a nonprofit organization, Cultural Exchange International to continue and expand the cultural exchanges between the U.S., and Western countries.  Jiang Ji-li currently resides in San Francisco, California.

Books
 Lotus and Feather
 The Magical Monkey King
 Red Kite, Blue Kite
 Red Scarf Girl

References 

1954 births
Living people
Chinese women writers
Chinese emigrants to the United States
American memoirists
American writers of Chinese descent
Shanghai University alumni
University of Hawaiʻi alumni
American women memoirists
21st-century American women